The United Centre (CU) was a Chilean political party that defined itself as transversal and centrist. It was created in early 2021 and is in the process of being legalized by the Electoral Service. It was led by Cristián Contreras Radovic, who expressed interest in presenting a presidential candidacy in the 2021 elections, but later became a candidate for Senator. It held one seat in the Chamber of Deputies of Chile prior to its dissolution, after which its member sat as an independent.

The party was dissolved in February 2022 because it did not receive at least 5% of votes in the 2021 parliamentary elections to maintain its legality.

History 
The origins of the group date back to November 2020, when journalist Cristián Contreras began the process of gathering support for a future political party. On January 7, 2021, the United Centre deed of incorporation was signed, which began the procedures before the Electoral Service of Chile (Servel) to begin its legalization process, which concluded on February 23 with the publication of the articles of incorporation.

On June 17, 2021, the party announced that it had reached 18,775 signatures, which would allow it to establish itself in the regions of Antofagasta, Coquimbo, Valparaíso, Metropolitana, O'Higgins, Maule, Biobío, Araucanía and Los Lagos. For the collection of signatures, the party had the support of Gino Lorenzini and Franco Parisi, both promoters of the Party of the People, who seek to develop a joint list of parliamentary candidates with United Centre.

Controversies 
The president of the party, Cristián Contreras Radovic, was criticized on several occasions for not wearing a mask in public spaces during the COVID-19 pandemic in Chile, especially in public events to collect signatures for the party.

Leadership 
 President: Cristián Contreras Radovic
 General Secretary: Olga Tosto García
 Treasurer: Patricia Ñúñez Alburns

Electoral History

Congress election

References

External links 
 Official site

Political parties established in 2021
Political parties disestablished in 2022
Political parties in Chile
2021 establishments in Chile
Confucian political parties
Anti-vaccination organizations
Organizations established for the COVID-19 pandemic